The 2003 Murcian regional election was held on Sunday, 25 May 2003, to elect the 6th Regional Assembly of the autonomous community of the Region of Murcia. All 45 seats in the Regional Assembly were up for election. The election was held simultaneously with regional elections in twelve other autonomous communities and local elections all throughout Spain.

Overview

Electoral system
The Regional Assembly of Murcia was the devolved, unicameral legislature of the autonomous community of Murcia, having legislative power in regional matters as defined by the Spanish Constitution and the Murcian Statute of Autonomy, as well as the ability to vote confidence in or withdraw it from a regional president.

Voting for the Regional Assembly was on the basis of universal suffrage, which comprised all nationals over 18 years of age, registered in the Region of Murcia and in full enjoyment of their political rights. The 45 members of the Regional Assembly of Murcia were elected using the D'Hondt method and a closed list proportional representation, with an electoral threshold of five percent of valid votes—which included blank ballots—being applied regionally. Seats were allocated to constituencies, which were established by law as follows:

District One 
District Two 
District Three 
District Four 
District Five 

Each constituency was entitled to an initial minimum of one seat, with the remaining 40 allocated among the constituencies in proportion to their populations.

Election date
The term of the Regional Assembly of Murcia expired four years after the date of its previous election. Elections to the Regional Assembly were fixed for the fourth Sunday of May every four years. The previous election was held on 13 June 1999, setting the election date for the Regional Assembly on Sunday, 25 May 2003.

The president had the prerogative to dissolve the Regional Assembly of Murcia and call a snap election, provided that no motion of no confidence was in process, no nationwide election was due and some time requirements were met: namely, that dissolution did not occur either during the first legislative session or within the legislature's last year ahead of its scheduled expiry, nor before one year had elapsed since a previous dissolution under this procedure. In the event of an investiture process failing to elect a regional president within a two-month period from the first ballot, the Regional Assembly was to be automatically dissolved and a fresh election called. Any snap election held as a result of these circumstances would not alter the period to the next ordinary election, with elected deputies merely serving out what remained of their four-year terms.

Parties and candidates
The electoral law allowed for parties and federations registered in the interior ministry, coalitions and groupings of electors to present lists of candidates. Parties and federations intending to form a coalition ahead of an election were required to inform the relevant Electoral Commission within ten days of the election call, whereas groupings of electors needed to secure the signature of at least one percent of the electorate in the Region of Murcia, disallowing electors from signing for more than one list of candidates.

Below is a list of the main parties and electoral alliances which contested the election:

Opinion polls
The table below lists voting intention estimates in reverse chronological order, showing the most recent first and using the dates when the survey fieldwork was done, as opposed to the date of publication. Where the fieldwork dates are unknown, the date of publication is given instead. The highest percentage figure in each polling survey is displayed with its background shaded in the leading party's colour. If a tie ensues, this is applied to the figures with the highest percentages. The "Lead" column on the right shows the percentage-point difference between the parties with the highest percentages in a poll. When available, seat projections determined by the polling organisations are displayed below (or in place of) the percentages in a smaller font; 23 seats were required for an absolute majority in the Regional Assembly of Murcia.

Results

Overall

Distribution by constituency

Aftermath

References
Opinion poll sources

Other

2003 in Murcia (region)
Murcia
Regional elections in the Region of Murcia
May 2003 events in Europe